Whyte (82) Avenue is an arterial road in south-central Edmonton, Alberta, Canada. It became the main street of the City of Strathcona as it formed, and now runs through Old Strathcona. It was named in 1891 after Sir William Whyte, who was superintendent of the CPR's western division from 1886 to 1897 and was knighted by King George V in 1911. Whyte (82) Avenue is part of a  continuous roadway that runs through Sherwood Park, Edmonton, and St. Albert that includes Wye Road, Sherwood Park Freeway, portions of University Avenue and Saskatchewan Drive, Groat Road, and St. Albert Trail.

The roadway was originally the core of the former city of Strathcona and was the division between the north and south quadrants while Main Street, now 104 Street (Calgary Trail) and was the division between the west and east quadrants. In 1912, Edmonton and Strathcona amalgamated Edmonton adopted its present numbering system; Whyte Avenue was co-designated 82 Avenue which allowed it to keep both names. As Alberta's highway system developed, Whyte Avenue became part of Highway 2 (previously Highway 1 prior to 1941) between 104 Street and 109 Street while it was part of Highway 14 east of 104 Street. The highway designations were moved to Whitemud Drive in the 1980s.

A small section of 82 Avenue exists as a collector road between 71 Street and 50 Street, where the main roadway transitions to the Sherwood Park Freeway.

Neighbourhoods 
List of neighbourhoods Whyte (82) Avenue runs through, in order from west to east:
Garneau
Queen Alexandra
Strathcona
Ritchie
Bonnie Doon
King Edward Park
Idylwylde
Kenilworth

Major intersections 
Starting at the west end of University Avenue.

See also 

 Old Strathcona
 List of avenues in Edmonton
 Transportation in Edmonton

References

Shopping districts and streets in Canada
Roads in Edmonton